Gonduz or Ganduz or Gondooz may refer to:
 Ganduz, Ardabil, Iran
 Gonduz, Hamadan, Iran

See also
 Kunduz, a city in Afghanistan